Bastien Bernard (born November 6, 1976 in Rochefort, France) is a retired professional footballer. He played as a midfielder.

External links
Bastien Bernard profile at chamoisfc79.fr

1976 births
Living people
French footballers
Association football midfielders
Chamois Niortais F.C. players
Ligue 2 players